Acer obtusifolium, the Syrian maple, is a Middle-eastern species of maple.

Description
Acer obtusifolium is an evergreen maple that forms a shrub, but can also be grown into a tree to a height of about 16 feet. It has leathery foliage varying from unlobed to tri-lobed. The leaves are normally gray-green.

Distribution

This species is found from eastern Turkey, Syria, Lebanon, Cyprus, and in Israel in Hermon and Galilee. It grows along coastal mountains.

References

External links
 Encyclopedia of Life photos

obtusifolium
Flora of Western Asia
Plants described in 1824